"Don't Rock the Jukebox" is a song co-written and performed by American country music artist Alan Jackson. It was released on April 29, 1991 as the lead single from the album of the same name, Don't Rock the Jukebox. It was his second consecutive Number One single on the U.S. Billboard Hot Country Singles & Tracks charts.  Jackson wrote the song with Roger Murrah and Keith Stegall.

The song also received an ASCAP award for Country Song of the Year in 1992.  That same year, the song was covered by Alvin and the Chipmunks, featuring commentary by Alan Jackson himself, for their 1992 album Chipmunks in Low Places.

Background and writing
The song is sung from the perspective of a heartbroken bar patron who wishes to hear country music to ease his heartbreak. As such, he tells the other patrons in the bar, "don't rock the jukebox" (i.e. play country instead of rock).

Jackson wrote about the inspiration at the beginning of the video: "I wanna tell you a little story about an incident that happened on the road a couple years ago when me and my band, The Strayhorns, were playing this little truck stop lounge up in Doswell, Virginia, a place called Geraldine's. We'd been there for four or five nights, you know, playing those dance sets. It'd been a long night, I took a break and walked over to the Jukebox. Roger, my bass player, was already over there reading the records, you know. I leaned up on the corner of it and one of the legs was broken off, jukebox kind of wobbling around, you know. And Roger looked up at me and said...".

Critical reception
Kevin John Coyne of Country Universe gave the song an A grade," saying that the song "defies explanation" because Jackson "perfectly inhabits the song’s affable weariness, and because Scott Hendricks and Keith Stegall arrange it to honky-tonk heaven."

Music video
The music video for the song premiered on May 2, 1991 on CMT, and was directed by Julien Temple, and begins in black and white, where Jackson described about the song, and then, it cuts to Jackson playing his guitar and singing the song while standing in front of a jukebox. As he does this, a seated figure in the shadows nods his head and taps the table to the beat. Several people come and dance in front of the jukebox during the song, including Hal Smith, referencing or possibly reprising his role as Otis Campbell from The Andy Griffith Show, while some people who come up to the jukebox shake it around angrily, thus prompting Jackson to sing the title line of the song. At the end of the video, the seated figure morphs into George Jones, who is mentioned in the song's lyrics several times.

Parodies
Award-winning parodist and comedian Cody Marshall released a parody of the song titled "Don't Watch the Springer", referencing The Jerry Springer Show''.

Chart positions

Year-end charts

References

Songs about jukeboxes
1991 singles
Alan Jackson songs
Songs written by Roger Murrah
Songs written by Alan Jackson
Songs written by Keith Stegall
Billboard Hot Country Songs number-one singles of the year
Song recordings produced by Keith Stegall
Song recordings produced by Scott Hendricks
Arista Nashville singles
1991 songs
Music videos directed by Julien Temple
Songs about country music